Saint-Georges-de-Poisieux is a commune in the Cher department in the Centre-Val de Loire region of France.

Geography
The A71 autoroute passes through the northern part of the commune.

Population

Sights
 Two churches, of St. Paul and St. Georges, both dating from the twelfth century.
 The sixteenth-century château of Poisieux.

See also
Communes of the Cher department

References

External links

Annuaire Mairie website 

Communes of Cher (department)